A territorial dispute or boundary dispute is a disagreement over the possession or control of land between two or more political entities.

Context and definitions

Territorial disputes are often related to the possession of natural resources such as rivers, fertile farmland, mineral or petroleum resources although the disputes can also be driven by culture, religion, and ethnic nationalism. Territorial disputes often result from vague and unclear language in a treaty that set up the original boundary.

Territorial disputes are a major cause of wars and terrorism, as states often try to assert their sovereignty over a territory through invasion, and non-state entities try to influence the actions of politicians through terrorism. International law does not support the use of force by one state to annex the territory of another state. The UN Charter states, "All Members shall refrain in their international relations from the threat or use of force against the territorial integrity or political independence of any state, or in any other manner inconsistent with the Purposes of the United Nations."

In some cases in which the boundary is not demarcated, such as the Taiwan Strait, and Kashmir, the parties involved define a Line of Control, which serves as the de facto international border.

The term border dispute (or border conflict) applies to cases in which a limited territory is disputed by two or more states, each contending state would publish its own maps to include the same region which would invariably lie along or adjacent to the recognised borders of the competing states, such as the Abyei region which is contested between South Sudan and the Sudan. With border conflicts, the existence of the rival state is not being challenged, such as the relationship between the People's Republic of China and the Republic of China or the relationship between North Korea and South Korea, but each state recognises the shape of the rival state only as not containing the claimed territory, in spite of who actually governs the land and how it is recognised in the international community.
An occupied territory, in general, is a region distinct from the recognized territory of the sovereign states but which the occupying state controls, usually with military forces. Sometimes, a long-term occupation is maintained as a means to act upon a territorial claim, but an occupation may also be strategic (such as creating a buffer zone or preventing a rival power obtaining control) or a means of coercion (such as a punishment, to impose some internal measures or for use as a bargaining chip).
The term irredentism applies to border disputes but also to wider territorial claims:
If a nation emerges when declaring independence from a larger state, its ultimate recognition may not always grant the new state control over the territory it proposed as part of the declaration. Those lands remain unredeemed territory in the eyes of nationalist movements from the state but do not otherwise cause a problem between the governments on each side of the border.
In cases that territory was achieved through historical conquests such as an empire, traditionalists may view former colonies as unredeemed territory.

Basis in international law
Territorial disputes have significant meaning in the international society, both by their relation to the fundamental right of states, sovereignty and also because they are important for international peace. International law has significant relations with territorial disputes because territorial disputes tackles the basis of international law; the state territory. International law is based on the persons of international law, which requires a defined territory, as mentioned in the 1933 Montevideo Convention on the Rights and Duties of States.

Article 1 of the Montevideo Convention declares that 
"a person of international law should possess the following qualifications: (a) a permanent population; (b) a defined territory; (c) government; and (d) capacity to enter into relations with other States"

Also, B. T. Sumner's article mentions, "In international law and relations, ownership of territory is significant because sovereignty over land defines what constitutes a state."

Therefore, the breach of a country's borders or territorial disputes pose a threat to a state's very sovereignty and the right as a person of international law.  In addition, territorial disputes are sometimes brought to the International Court of Justice, as was the case in Costa Rica and Nicaragua (2005). Territorial disputes cannot be separated from international law, whose basis is on the law of state borders, and their potential settlement also relies on international law and the Court.

See also 
 List of territorial disputes
 List of border conflicts (including only those that involve fighting)
 Fait accompli
 Frozen conflict
 Israeli–Palestinian conflict
 Status quo ante bellum
 Thalweg
 Territorial disputes in the South China Sea
 Territorial disputes in the Persian Gulf
 Territorial disputes of Nicaragua

References

External links 
 Lectures by Malcolm Shaw entitled The International Legal Principles Relating to Territorial Disputes: The Acquisition of Title to Territory and Settling Territorial Disputes in the Lecture Series of the United Nations Audiovisual Library of International Law
WorldStatesman – click on any state for the listing (after the chronological lists of statesmen) of Territorial Disputes it is party to
Territorial disputes  in CIA World Factbook
USState Department/ FloridaStateUniversity International Border Studies
List of top 10 Territorial disputes

 Territorial dispute